Elictognathidae is an extinct conodont family.

Genera are Alternognathus, Elictognathus, and Pinacognathus.

References

External links 

 Elictognathidae at fossilworks.org (retrieved 30 April 2016)

Ozarkodinida families